The list of ship launches in 1996 includes a chronological list of all ships launched in 1996.


References

1996
1996 in transport